Head Automatica was an American rock band from Brooklyn, New York fronted by Daryl Palumbo (also of Glassjaw).

History
The beginnings of the band stemmed from singer Daryl Palumbo's interests in the hip hop and Britpop genres. Palumbo felt that the material that was inspired by these genres did not fit into Glassjaw's spectrum and so Head Automatica was created to showcase this.

The band's debut album, Decadence, was released August 17, 2004. Charting on the Billboard 200 and Top Heatseekers charts, the album was the brainchild of Palumbo, who was known better for his work in post-hardcore music, and Dan 'The Automator' Nakamura, famous for his production work with groups including Gorillaz and Handsome Boy Modeling School.  The two allegedly met at a party and worked on what later became the album.  Palumbo then recruited the other current members as a touring group, and toured the United States, playing with bands such as Interpol, The Rapture, The Used and The Cure.

The band released their second album, entitled Popaganda, on June 6, 2006.  This album was produced by Howard Benson, who had already worked with Head Automatica on several tracks from Decadence. With the departure of Nakamura, the band took a more organic, classic power-pop approach citing Squeeze and Elvis Costello as influences.

In 2006, the band toured with Avenged Sevenfold and Coheed and Cambria, and joined Taking Back Sunday, Angels & Airwaves, and The Subways for a month of touring on June 22. In October 2006, drummer and founding member Larry Gorman was fired from the band for undisclosed reasons, with Brandon Reid being announced as his replacement. The band scheduled a headlining fall tour with Rock Kills Kid, but chose to cancel it after playing only a few dates. Instead, they supported Thirty Seconds to Mars on their Welcome to the Universe Tour along with The Receiving End of Sirens, Cobra Starship, and Rock Kills Kid. In early 2007, Head Automatica played direct support on The West Coast Winter Tour with Jack's Mannequin, We Are The Fury, and The Audition. The band visited the UK for the first time for a headlining tour that started at Southampton University on May 23, 2007, and performed at Rock Am Ring festival in Nürburg, Germany on June 1. August 2007 saw yet another change in the line up, with New York hardcore veteran Sammy Siegler taking over the drum kit.

Head Automatica started pre-production on their third album in late September 2007, aiming for a "darker" sound and "grimy, dancefloor-friendly" songs. The band recorded half of the material with producer Jason Lader and the other with The Brothers (the production team of Josh Topolsky and Eric Emm). Sammy Siegler handled the drumming duties, and Albert Wing, Bruce Fowler and Gary Grant recorded the brass section. The band appeared in a Christmas-themed skit on The Tonight Show with Jay Leno on December 18, 2008 and went on a short North American tour with Radio 4 in January 2009. They appeared at the 2009 South by Southwest music conference. In May 2009, Palumbo confirmed that they had finished recording their next album, entitled Swan Damage. In an interview with Revolt online magazine Palumbo stated that the record "captures everything we ever intended Head Automatica to be. It covers the genre spectrum; there are powerful clubby tracks, garage-pop tracks, and body-rocking tracks. This album really reflects the full spectrum of music this band is capable of playing.” The band have been performing songs from Swan Damage live, working titles including "Can't Stand Amadeus", "End of Heat", "Too Ashamed", "Face Upon the Floor", "Spitzer", "Sega", "It's a Lie" and "Hard as Mud".

In July 2009 Head Automatica played a string of US dates with Cubic Zirconia and have gone missing from the public eye for more than a year, with no announcements regarding Swan Damage. The band re-emerged with a new rhythm section of drummer Guy Licata (Cold Cave, Hercules & Love Affair) and bassist Rick Penzone (Men, Women & Children) to perform at the Music Hall of Williamsburg in Brooklyn, New York on October 20, 2010. On October 21, 2010 Palumbo tweeted a link to the Cubic Zirconia remix of the still-to-be-released track "Can't Stand Amadeus".

On May 30, 2012, Palumbo revealed via Twitter that Warner Bros. Records have effectively shelved the masters for Swan Damage. July 2012 issue of Southampton Music featured an interview with Palumbo, in which he cited legal issues (that supposedly arose when he decided to end his contract with the label) as the reason for the three-year delay, but expressed confidence in the album being released "soon".

In August 2012 Head Automatica toured the UK as a four-piece, performing material from Swan Damage and new versions of songs from their first two records.

It was announced in mid-December 2022, that Head Automatica would play the Furnace Fest in September 2023.

It was announced in mid-January 2023, that Head Automatica would play the Sad Summer Festival in 2023.

Band members

 Daryl Palumbo — lead vocals (2003–2012)
 Jessie Nelson — keyboards (2005–2012)
 Rick Penzone — guitar, bass (2010–2012)
 Steven Heet — drums (2012)
 Vinnie Caruana — guitar (2003)
 Brandon Arnovick — guitar (2003–2004)
 Craig Bonich — guitar (2003–2010)
 Josh "Jarvis" Holden — bass (2003–2009)
 Larry Gorman — drums (2003–2006)
 Brandon Reid — drums (2006–2007)
 Sammy Siegler — drums (2007–2009)
 Guy Licata — drums (2010)
 Jim Greer — keyboards (2003–2004)
 Dan Nakamura — turntables, production (2003–2004)

Timeline

Discography

Albums

Unreleased
 The Vipen Sessions/Bang! Hon Out! Sessions (2005, Popaganda pre-production)
 Decadence (May 2004 Production Disc)
 Tokyo Decadence (February 2004 Production Disc)
 Westworld (Demo) (2003)
 Rough Demo (Demo) (2003)

EPs
 Beating Heart Baby EP (iTunes Download) (Import) – Warner Bros. Records – 2005
 Beating Heart Baby (remix CD/digital release) – Warner Bros. Records – 2005/2006
 Pop Rocks EP (iTunes Download) – Warner Bros. Records – 2006

Singles
 "Brooklyn Is Burning"
 "Beating Heart Baby" – UK No. 44
 "At the Speed of a Yellow Bullet"
 "Please Please Please (Young Hollywood)"
 "Graduation Day"
 "Lying Through Your Teeth"

Music videos
 "Brooklyn Is Burning" (2004)
 "Beating Heart Baby" (2005)
 "The Razor" (2005?) (unreleased, unfinished edit can be found on YouTube)
 "Beating Heart Baby" (Chris Lord-Alge mix) (2006)
 "Graduation Day" (2006)
 "Lying Through Your Teeth" (2006)

References

External links
 Head Automatica on Myspace
 Daryl Palumbo Interview with Revolt Music Blog

Musical groups established in 2004
American power pop groups
Musical groups from Long Island